Arianna Fidanza (born 6 January 1995) is an Italian professional racing cyclist, who currently rides for UCI Women's WorldTeam . Arianna Fidanza is the daughter of former racing cyclist Giovanni Fidanza, and the sister of Martina Fidanza.

Major results

2012
 UEC European Junior Track Championships
1st  Points race
3rd  Team pursuit
2013
 1st  Points race, UCI Juniors Track World Championships
 1st  Team pursuit, UEC European Junior Track Championships
 National Junior Road Championships
1st  Time trial
2nd Road race
2014
 3rd Points race, International Track Women & Men (Under-23)
2015
 5th SwissEver GP Cham-Hagendorn
 9th La Madrid Challenge by La Vuelta
2016
 1st Stage 1 Tour of Zhoushan Island
 3rd Gran Premio della Liberazione
 3rd Points race, 6 giorni delle rose – Fiorenzuola
 4th Gran Premio Bruno Beghelli Internazionale Donne Elite
2017
 3rd SwissEver GP Cham-Hagendorn
2018
 2nd SwissEver GP Cham-Hagendorn
 6th Gran Premio Bruno Beghelli Internazionale Donne Elite
2019
 1st Tour of Taiyuan International Women's Road Cycling Race
 2nd Tour of Zhoushan Island I
 5th Overall Tour of Zhoushan Island II
 6th La Périgord Ladies
 10th Gran Premio Bruno Beghelli Internazionale Donne Elite
2020
 4th Vuelta a la Comunitat Valenciana Feminas
 6th GP de Plouay
 8th Omloop van het Hageland
2021
 4th Dwars door de Westhoek
2022
 5th GP Oetingen

See also
 List of 2015 UCI Women's Teams and riders

References

External links
 

1995 births
Living people
Italian female cyclists
Cyclists from Bergamo
Cyclists at the 2015 European Games
European Games competitors for Italy
21st-century Italian women